Rabbit Bandini Productions is a film and television production company founded in 2003 by actors/filmmakers James Franco and Vince Jolivette. The name comes from combining the titular hero from John Updike's Rabbit tetralogy with the hero of John Fante's Ask the Dust, Arturo Bandini.

Works
Recent credits include director Gia Coppola's drama Palo Alto and Franco's directorial adaptations of Pulitzer Prize-winning author Cormac McCarthy's Child of God and Nobel Prize-winning author William Faulkner's As I Lay Dying and The Sound and The Fury premiering at the 2014 Venice Film Festival.

Rabbit Bandini Productions has multiple projects in various stages of development. In production, In Dubious Battle, based on the Steinbeck book of the same name. The Adderall Diaries directed by Pamela Romanowsky, starring Franco, Ed Harris, Amber Heard and Christian Slater.

Completed in 2015 was Justin Kelly's directorial adaptation of the biopic I Am Michael, with Franco, Zachary Quinto and Emma Roberts and Zeroville directed by Franco, starring Megan Fox, Seth Rogen and Will Ferrell along with Franco. The company teamed up with Seth Rogen and Evan Goldberg on The Disaster Artist, which is financed by Good Universe. In 2015, the company also produced "Actors Anonymous", a film funded by Sara Von Kienegger, in conjunction with students and the USC Film School.

Filmography

References

External links 
 Rabbit Bandini Productions on IMDb
 Rabbit Bandini Productions Facebook

Film production companies of the United States
Entertainment companies established in 2003
Mass media companies established in 2003
American film studios